La Fortuna is a district of the Bagaces canton, in the Guanacaste province of Costa Rica.

History 
La Fortuna was created on 14 August 1968 by Decreto 29. Segregated from Bagaces.

Geography 
La Fortuna has an area of  km² and an elevation of  metres.

Villages
Administrative center of the district is the town of La Fortuna.

Other villages are Casavieja (partly), Cuipilapa, Giganta, Hornillas, Macuá, Martillete, Mozotal, Pozo Azul, Sagrada Familia, San Bernardo, San Joaquín, Santa Fe, Santa Rosa and Unión Ferrer.

Demographics 

For the 2011 census, La Fortuna had a population of  inhabitants.

Transportation

Road transportation 
The district is covered by the following road routes:
 National Route 165

References 

Districts of Guanacaste Province
Populated places in Guanacaste Province